Nussensee is a lake in Upper Austria. It is located at Bad Ischl in the Salzkammergut. It is fed almost entirely by underground springs and is subject to fluctuations in level of several metres. This helps support rare plants such as the common water chestnut (Trapa natans) grow near the lake.

External links
 Seen und Badeseen in Österreich 
 Wanderinformationen 

Lakes of Upper Austria